Every Living Thing may refer to:
 Every Living Thing (stories), by Cynthia Rylant
 Every Living Thing (book), a book on biology by Rob Dunn
 Every Living Thing, a book by James Herriot